Halotolerance is the adaptation of living organisms to conditions of high salinity. Halotolerant species tend to live in areas such as hypersaline lakes, coastal dunes, saline deserts, salt marshes, and inland salt seas and springs. Halophiles are organisms that live in highly saline environments, and require the salinity to survive, while halotolerant organisms (belonging to different domains of life) can grow under saline conditions, but do not require elevated concentrations of salt for growth. Halophytes are salt-tolerant higher plants. Halotolerant microorganisms are of considerable biotechnological interest.

Applications
Fields of scientific research relevant to halotolerance include biochemistry, molecular biology, cell biology, physiology, ecology, and genetics.

An understanding of halotolerance can be applicable to areas such as arid-zone agriculture, xeriscaping, aquaculture (of fish or algae), bioproduction of desirable compounds (such as phycobiliproteins or carotenoids) using seawater to support growth, or remediation of salt-affected soils. In addition, many environmental stressors involve or induce osmotic changes, so knowledge gained about halotolerance can also be relevant to understanding tolerance to extremes in moisture or temperature.

Goals of studying halotolerance include increasing the agricultural productivity of lands affected by soil salination or where only saline water is available. Conventional agricultural species could be made more halotolerant by gene transfer from naturally halotolerant species (by conventional breeding or genetic engineering) or by applying treatments developed from an understanding of the mechanisms of halotolerance. In addition, naturally halotolerant plants or microorganisms could be developed into useful agricultural crops or fermentation organisms.

Cellular functions in halophytes
Tolerance of high salt conditions can be obtained through several routes. High levels of salt entering the plant can trigger ionic imbalances which cause complications in respiration and photosynthesis, leading to reduced rates of growth, injury and death in severe cases. To be considered tolerant of saline conditions, the protoplast must show methods of balancing the toxic and osmotic effects of the increased salt concentrations. Halophytic vascular plants can survive on soils with salt concentrations around 6%, or up to 20% in extreme cases. Tolerance of such conditions is reached through the use of stress proteins and compatible cytoplasm osmotic solutes.

To exist in such conditions, halophytes tend to be subject to the uptake of high levels of salt into their cells, and this is often required to maintain an osmotic potential lower than that of the soil to ensure water uptake. High salt concentrations within the cell can be damaging to sensitive organelles such as the chloroplast, so sequestration of salt is seen. Under this action, salt is stored within the vacuole to protect such delicate areas. If high salt concentrations are seen within the vacuole, a high concentration gradient will be established between the vacuole and the cytoplasm, leading to high levels of energy investment to maintain this state. Therefore, the accumulation of compatible cytoplasmic osmotic solutes can be seen to prevent this situation from occurring. Amino acids such as proline accumulate in halophytic Brassica species, quaternary ammonium bases such as Glycine Betaine and sugars have been shown to act in this role within halophytic members of Chenopodiaceae and members of Asteraceae show the buildup of cyclites and soluble sugars. The buildup of these compounds allow for the balancing of the osmotic effect while preventing the establishment of toxic concentrations of salt or requiring the maintenance of high concentration gradients.

Bacterial halotolerance
The extent of halotolerance varies widely amongst different species of bacteria. A number of cyanobacteria are halotolerant; an example location of occurrence for such cyanobacteria is in the Makgadikgadi Pans, a large hypersaline lake in Botswana.

Fungal halotolerance
Fungi from habitats with high concentration of salt are mostly halotolerant (i.e. they do not require salt for growth) and not halophilic. Halophilic fungi are a rare exception. Halotolerant fungi constitute a relatively large and constant part of hypersaline environment communities, such as those in the solar salterns. Well studied examples include the yeast Debaryomyces hansenii and black yeasts Aureobasidium pullulans and Hortaea werneckii. The latter can grow in media without salt, as well as in almost saturated NaCl solutions. To emphasize this unusually wide adaptability, some authors describe H. werneckii as "extremely halotolerant".

See also

References

Environmental microbiology
Geomicrobiology
Microbial growth and nutrition

de:Halophil